The axle load of a wheeled vehicle is the total weight bearing on the roadway for all wheels connected to a given axle. Axle load is an important design consideration in the engineering of roadways and railways, as both are designed to tolerate a maximum weight-per-axle (axle load); exceeding the maximum rated axle load will cause damage to the roadway or railway tracks.

Railway use
On railways, a given section of tracks is designed to support a maximum axle load.  The maximum axle load is determined by train speeds, weight of rails, density of sleepers and fixtures, amount and standard of ballast, and strength of bridges and earthworks.  Higher operating speeds can be achieved by reducing axle loads and increased load-carrying capacity. Operating above the specified load can cause catastrophic failure of track components. The diameter of the wheels also affects the maximum axle load of a Talgo RD wagon.

United Kingdom
The standard rail weight for British railways is now . Higher axle loads are now permitted, e.g. the Class 67 locomotive is a four-axle machine weighing , giving  on each axle.

Australia

Kenya 
In 2022, sixteen new metre-gauge locomotives were supplied by CRRC with axleloads of 12.5 tonnes, 14 tonnes, and 18 tonnes respectively.

Bridge loading 
Bridges may have to carry several locomotives or wagons at the same time, especially on longer spans; in that case they require separate calculation of maximum allowable axle load. A weak bridge may limit the axle load of the full line. Theodore Cooper developed the E10 loading system for calculating the strength of bridges.

Roadway use 

The term axle load is also applicable to trucks, and this context is complicated by some trucks having more than two wheels per axle. The axle load remains the same, but the load borne by the individual wheels is reduced by having more contact area (more wheels, larger tires, lower tire pressure) to distribute the load.

See also 
 Federal Bridge Gross Weight Formula
 Gross axle weight rating
 Rail profile

References

External links 
 Managing rail degradation on the Malmbanan, Thomas Nordmark and Dr Per-Olof Larsson-Kraik, Railway Gazette International June 2007.

Rolling stock